Iivantiira is a medium-sized lake of Finland. It belongs to Oulujoki main catchment area and it is situated in Kuhmo municipality in the Kainuu region. Iivantiira is connected to the lake Juttuajärvi with Hoikka strait, and together they form a lake Iivantiira–Juttuajärvi. The lake  belongs to Änättijärvi–Lentiira–Iivantiira–Lentua-Sotkamo kayaking route named Tervareitti, The Tar Route.

References

Lakes of Kuhmo